Christoph Dientzenhofer (7 July 1655 in St. Margarethen – 20 June 1722 in Prague) was a Bavarian architect of South-German, Austrian and Bohemian Baroque. He was a member of the famous Dientzenhofer family of architects, and the father of Kilian Ignaz Dientzenhofer.

Among his works are the Church of St. Nicholas (1703–1711, later completed by his son) and the Brevnov Monastery (1708–1721) in Prague, Church of St. Clare in Cheb (1708–1711). Some of his works are difficult to identify, due to the lack of documentation.

See also
Baroque architecture in Central Europe
Czech Baroque architecture

References

External links 

 Pension Dientzenhofer Home of Christoph, birthplace of Kilian Ignaz Dientzenhofer

1655 births
1722 deaths
Austrian Baroque architects
Czech Baroque architects
German Baroque architects
German Bohemian people
People from Rosenheim (district)